Tishan Maraj (born 22 November 1984) is a Trinidadian cricketer. He played in twelve first-class and four List A matches for Trinidad and Tobago from 2003 to 2011.

See also
 List of Trinidadian representative cricketers

References

External links
 

1984 births
Living people
Trinidad and Tobago cricketers